XHCAQ-FM 92.3/XECAQ-AM 740 is a combo radio station in Cancún, Quintana Roo. It is owned by and carries the Radio Fórmula network.

740 AM is a Canadian clear-channel frequency, on which CFZM in Toronto, Ontario is the dominant Class A station.  XECAQ-AM must reduce nighttime power in order to prevent interference to the skywave signal of CFZM.

History
XECAQ received its first concession on July 25, 1994. It was originally owned by Norma Campillo González and broadcast on 1080 kHz. That November, the station was authorized for its FM combo, XHCAQ-FM 92.3. In 1998, Radio Fórmula bought the station.

References

Radio stations in Quintana Roo
Radio stations established in 1994
Radio Fórmula
1994 establishments in Mexico